The 1909–10 season was the 11th season for FC Barcelona.

Squad

Results

External links

References

FC Barcelona seasons
Barcelona